Cyrtodactylus nicobaricus is a species of gecko endemic to the Nicobar Islands (India).

References

Cyrtodactylus
Endemic fauna of the Nicobar Islands
Reptiles of India
Reptiles described in 2020